The University of Louisville College of Business is a college of the University of Louisville. The college enrolls about 2500 students in a variety of programs such as:

 Master of Business Administration (MBA) Offered Full-Time, Part-Time and Online.
 Master of Science in Business Analytics (MSBA)
 Doctor of Business Administration in Entrepreneurship (PhD)
 Master of Accountancy (MAC) with a data analytics focus
 Online Graduate Certificates in Accounting, Franchise Management, Managerial Analytics, Family Business Management and Advising, Horse Racing Industry Business, and Distilled Spirits Business.
 Global Master of Business Administration (MBA) Graduates earn two graduate degrees, one from the University of Louisville College of Business and the other from our European partner Edinburgh Business School in Germany
Executive Education programs in Project Management, Franchising, Leadership, Grant Writing, and Problem Solving

Todd Mooradian was appointed Dean of the College of Business in 2016. According to the U.S. News & World Report Business School rankings, U of L Business is ranked 85 nationally and 81% of its graduates are employed within 9 months of graduation. The median starting salary for these individuals was $64,614.

See also
List of Atlantic Coast Conference business schools

References

External links
 

Business
Business schools in Kentucky